The 2004 Utah gubernatorial election took place on November 2, 2004. The incumbent governor was Republican Olene S. Walker, who had become governor following Mike Leavitt's resignation to join the George W. Bush administration. However, Walker placed fourth in the Republican primary, far behind Jon Huntsman Jr. Huntsman won the nomination and went on to win the general election, carrying 25 of the 29 counties and winning 57.7% of the overall vote. This was the last time that a Democratic nominee for any statewide office has received forty percent or more of the popular vote, and the most recent election in which a Democratic nominee carried more than three counties in the state.

Background
In March 2003, Huntsman resigned his post in the Bush administration. In mid-August, three term incumbent Governor Mike Leavitt, whom Huntsman strongly supported, decided not to run for re-election to a fourth term, in order to become the Administrator of the Environmental Protection Agency under the Bush administration. Shortly thereafter, Huntsman filed papers to run for Governor of Utah. In November 2003, Lieutenant Governor Olene S. Walker became the Utah's first female governor as Leavitt was confirmed to become EPA Administrator.

Democratic nomination
Scott Matheson, Jr. entered the race on March 27, 2004. He won the May Democratic nomination unopposed.

Republican primary

Convention
Candidates
Gary Benson, businessman
James Hansen, U.S. Congressman of Utah's 1st congressional district
Parley Hellewell, State Senator
Jon Huntsman, Jr., Trade Ambassador for President Bush's administration and former CEO of Huntsman Chemical Corporation
Nolan Karras, State Representative
Fred Lampropoulos, CEO of Merit Medical Systems
Martin Stephens, State Representative
Olene Walker, incumbent Governor

Results, first round

Results, final round, instant-runoff

Primary
Candidates
Jon Huntsman Jr., Trade Ambassador for President Bush's administration and former CEO of Huntsman Chemical Corporation
Nolan Karras, State Representative

Campaign
Huntsman gained the endorsements from U.S. Senator Jake Garn and former U.S. President George H. W. Bush. Polls showed he was the front-runner.

Results

General election

Candidates
Jon Huntsman, Jr. (R), Trade Ambassador for President Bush's administration and former CEO of Huntsman Chemical Corporation
Scott Matheson, Jr. (D), U.S. Attorney

Campaign
Jon Huntsman Jr., a former advisor for U.S. Presidents Ronald Reagan, George H. W. Bush, and George W. Bush and son of industrialist Jon Huntsman, Sr.—the founder of Huntsman Chemical Corporation—filed papers to run for governor in September 2003. Jason Chaffetz was his campaign manager. In April 2004, Utah County Commissioner Gary Herbert decided to drop out of the Republican nomination and become Huntsman's running mate. Herbert helped Huntsman with the rural community. Huntsman campaigned on eliminating the sales tax on food and on ethics reform. He proposed that lawmakers have to disclose all their gifts, they have to report monthly their campaign contributions, and they can't work as lobbyists immediately after leaving state government. Huntsman opposed President Bush's No Child Left Behind Act. He said he would leave a label on the door of the governor's office "Economic Development Czar" if he's elected.

U.S. Attorney, former Harvard University professor, and dean of the University of Utah law school Scott Matheson, Jr. won the Democratic nomination unopposed. He is the son of former Utah Governor Scott Matheson who was also the last Democrat to be elected governor of the red state of Utah. He made education the number one priority. He explained how better schools would attract new business. In one television ad, he called himself "Utah's Education Governor." He criticized Huntsman for supporting school choice reform.

Predictions

Polling
In a March Deseret Morning News/KSL-TV poll, Matheson was leading all the Republicans running for the nomination except for Huntsman and Walker. An early September Jones poll showed Huntsman leading 49%-39%. An October 6 Salt Lake Tribune poll showed Huntsman leading 49%-33%. An October 7 Deseret Morning News/KSL-TV poll showed Huntsman only leading 49%-40%. An October 29 Salt Lake Tribune poll showed Huntsman leading 50%-36%.

Fundraising
Huntsman raised a little over $3.5 million. Nearly $950,000 of the money raised was from his own personal loans and from family donations. He also raised 100,000 from the Republican Governors Association. Matheson raised almost $2.0 million. About one-fourth of Matheson's funds came from political committees, including $325,000 from the Democratic Governors Association.

Results

References

See also
Election Results – Utah Lieutenant Governor's Office

Gubernatorial
2004
Utah